The Accursed Mountains (both translated as "Cursed Mountains"), also known as the Albanian Alps, are a mountain group in the western part of the Balkans. It is the southernmost subrange of the  Dinaric Alps range (Dinarides), extending from northern Albania to southern Kosovo and northeastern Montenegro. One of the southernmost glacial masses in Europe was discovered in the Albanian part of the range in 2009.

Name 
Ptolemy mentioned , which has been connected to the Accursed Mountains. Bertiscus lives on artificially in the form bertiscae in the scientific names for endemic species that have their locus classicus in the mountains, such as Valeriana bertiscae, Crepis bertiscae and Iris bertiscae.

Both in Serbo-Croatian  and in Albanian  mean "the accursed (mountains)", possibly because they are perceived as insurmountable and wild.

Location and relief 

These points are at 42°45' and 42°15' N in the Mediterranean zone of the western Balkan Peninsula. The southern boundary of the Accursed Mountains is found at the river Drin and its tributary Valbona. In a broader sense the Accursed Mountains also include the mountain ranges to Mitrovica with the Hajla and Mokna massifs. Some authors, however, see the river Lim as the northern boundary of the Accursed Mountains in geological terms.

From Lake Skadar, the mountains stretch northeast along the Cem river then curve slightly to the east in the direction of Gjervica summit above the western Kosovo (450m) basin. From here, the Accursed Mountains turn northwards over the Bogićevića massif and Čakor pass and continue with another row of mountains. The Accursed Mountains finish in the area of upper Ibar River valley near Mitrovica, just after the Suva Planina massif that encircles Dukagjin basin from the north and northwest.

The Accursed Mountains are ethnographically and sociologically diverse with many tribes living in the region as sheep herders. Names of various Albanian tribes (Hoti, Gruda, Kelmendi, Kastrati, Dukagjini, Shkreli, Shala, Nikaj, Krasniqi, Gashi, Kuci and Rugova) refer to their geographical locations within the range.

Geology 

The Accursed Mountains are a typical Dinaric karst high mountain range with a pronounced steep topography and glacial features. Overhanging walls and ridges forming pointed peaks are typical of the western and central Accursed Mountains. The eastern mountains are less rugged with lower relief. The valleys show characteristic effects of Pleistocene glaciation. Most of the area was modified by glacial activity with karstic areas in the western parts.

The range was formed by the folding resulting from the collision of the African and Eurasian plates. Nowhere in the Balkans have glaciers left so much evidence of erosion. After the Alps, these mountains are the most glaciated in Europe south of the Scandinavian ice sheet. They have very steep limestone slopes with abundant karst features. The Accursed Mountains are a large, rugged, pathless range. It is one of the rare mountain ranges in Europe that has not been explored entirely.

In some areas, the Accursed Mountains run almost parallel with the Šar Mountains in North Macedonia, Albania and Kosovo. This tectonic crash produced the unusual zig-zag shape of the range and also their curving from the dominant Dinaric northwestern – southeastern direction toward the northeastern one. In the western and central parts of the range the composition of the mountains is of mainly uniform with Mesozoic limestones and dolomites of the Jurassic and Cretaceous ages. In the eastern Accursed Mountains in addition to the limestone and dolomite series, there are rocks from the late Palaeozoic and Triassic periods, medium-Triassic volcanic rocks and Jurassic metamorphic rocks.

The Kalktafel is cut deeply with valleys in a variety of rock blocks of the mountains north of Përroi i Thatë, the Biga e Gimajive south of it, the Jezerca block between Shala and Valbona valley, the massif of the Maja e Hekurave, the plateau of the Maja e Kolats north of Valbona and Shkëlzen northeast of Valbona.

Although some scientific research gives the Accursed Mountains the status of a separate mountain chain, in most other ways this chain is still considered the highest of all Dinaric areas, connected with the Dinaric mountain chain in terms of geology, morphology, and ethnography.

Massifs 
The Accursed Mountains are made up of many large sections or mountain massifs/groups, all of which are connected to one another.

Canyons and valleys 

Erosion during glaciation left many telltale features behind. Deep river canyons and flat valleys wind around the ridges of the mountains. The largest canyon is Rugova Canyon. It has very steep vertical mountain slopes on both sides. Valleys common at lower altitudes are found at the alpine level, creating mountain passes and valley troughs, such as Buni Jezerce in Albania. Buni Jezerce means "Valley of the Lakes" and it contains six small glacial lakes, the biggest being called the Big lake of Buni Jezerce.

Canyons in the Accursed Mountains
 Rugova Canyon
 Deçani Canyon
 Gashi Canyon
 Cemi Canyon

Valleys in the Accursed Mountains
 Vermosh Valley
 Valbona Valley
 Thethi Valley
 Ropojona Valley
 Gerbja Valley
 Buni Jezerce
 Cemi i Nikçit Valley

Rivers and lakes 

The Accursed Mountains include many of the important rivers of the southeastern part of the Western Balkans. Rivers in this range fall roughly into two main categories, those that flow into the Lim and those that enter the White Drin and meet the Black Drin downstream at the Drin confluence. The southern and eastern slopes of the Accursed Mountains fall into the latter category. The Tara and Lim rivers, two major sources of the Dinaric river system, originate on the northern borders of the Accursed Mountains. The Vërmosh originates in the northwest mountainous part in Montenegro, close to the border with Albania. As a tributary of the Drina it drains into the Danube and then into the Black Sea. The Lim flows through the Plav lake. The Ibar, which originates on the slopes of the Hajla, takes a similar route into the Danube via the West Morava in Serbia.

In the southern Accursed Mountains, the Drin dominates. However, not all of the Drin flows near or parallel to the Accursed Mountains. One Drin tributary is the Valbona, which drains into the Adriatic Sea, and its eastern tributary the Gashi River. To the west of the mountains is the Cem, which drains the northwestern part of the Montenegrin-Albanian border area to the Adriatic. Water levels fluctuate because the karst topography drains the water underground. Some rivers or streams, such as Përroi i Thatë in Albania, dry out completely during the summer droughts. Although the Peja Bistrica in Kosovo is short, it is very powerful and carved the Rugova Canyon.

There are about 20 small alpine lakes of glacial origin in the Accursed Mountains. Many lakes are in the Bogiçevica border area between Kosovo and Albania and the Buni i Jezercë trough near the Jezerca and Bojs peaks. Some lakes, such as Lake Liqenat in Kosovo and Hrid Lake in Montenegro, are tourist attractions. Hrid Lake is a clear example of a well-preserved glacial relief. In the Pleistocene period this was a collection area for ice that fell down over steps of rock from surrounding peaks, dragging with it heterogeneous material. Precipitation washed away smaller rocks, but larger ones remain on the southwestern and western lake shore. In addition to precipitation, it receives water from sources near its shores. The largest lake is Lake Plav in Montenegro.

Waterfalls are found in some parts of the range. Because it is not far from Peja, it is easily accessible and frequented by many visitors. The Ali Pasha natural springs in Montenegro near Gusinje are the premium attraction for the town.

Highest peaks 
Peaks over 
 Maja Jezercë (in Albania)
 Gjeravica (in Kosovo)
 Maja Grykat e Hapëta (in Albania)

Peaks over 

 Maja e Radohimës (in Albania)
 Maja e Popljuces (in Albania)
 Maja Briaset (in Albania)
 Maja e Hekurave (in Albania)
 Rodi e Kollatës (in Albania)
 Maja e Shënikut (in Albania)
 Maja Tat (in Albania)
 Gusan (in Albania and Kosovo)
 Zla Kolata/Kollata e Keqe (in Albania and Montenegro)
 Marijaš/Marijash (in Kosovo)
 Dobra Kolata/Kolata e Mirë (in Albania and Montenegro)
 Rosni Vrh/Maja e Rosit (in Montenegro)
 Žuti kamen/Guri i Kuq (in Kosovo)
 Maja Visens (in Albania)
 Maja Kokervhake (in Albania)
 Rops/Maja e Ropës (in Kosovo)

Peaks over 

 Maja Shkurt (in Albania)
 Maja Reshkullit (in Albania)
 Maja e Malësores (in Albania)
 Karanfili (Veliki Vrh, Kremeni Vrh, Maja Gurt e Zjarmit) (in Montenegro)
 Maja e Ragamit (in Albania)
 Maja Bojs (in Albania)
 Koprivnik/Kopranik (in Kosovo)
 Maja Vukoces (in Albania)
 Veternik (in Albania)
 Shkëlzen (in Albania)
 Maja e Thatë (in Albania)
 Pasji Peak (in Kosovo and Montenegro)
 Maja Bogiçaj (in Albania and Kosovo)
 Hajla (in Kosovo and Montenegro)

Peaks under 

 Rusulija
 Streoc
 Tromeđa
 Žljeb
 Maja e Kakisë
 Liqenat
 Rrasa e Zogut
 Hajla e Vëranocit
 Junik
 Maja Stogut (in Albania)
 Maja e Elbunit
 Deçan Mountain
 Maja Harapit
 Maja Trojan
 Pogled
 Maja Dramadol
 Beleg
 Maja e Ershellit
 Maja e Vjelakut
 Hajla e Shkrelit
 Maja e Madhe
 Maja e Grebenit
 Lice Mountain
 Maja e Veleçikut

Climate 
The Accursed Mountains are on the whole the wettest area of Europe. At higher elevations snow is found even in summer, except in very dry years.

Glaciation 
There are at least five active glaciers that probably formed during the late Holocene period, and some inactive glaciers between 1,980 and 2,420 meters high. The trough valleys of Ropojani, Grbaja and Valbona were carved by kilometres of glaciers during the last ice age. Detailed geomorphological mapping was used to reconstruct the positions of former glaciers. In addition, there are about 20 small lakes of glacial origin as described above, including the Buni Jezercë group of lakes on the northern side of the Jezerca Peak, the Ridsko Lake, the Bukumirsko Lake and the Rikavačko Lake.

A recent report from geographers at the University of Manchester details the discovery of four previously unknown glaciers in the Albanian part of the mountain range at 1980–2100 m high, found in the area close to Maja e Jezerces. The glaciers, the largest of which is currently the size of six football pitches, vary in size every year according to the amount of winter snowfall and temperatures during the following summer. A significant proportion of this accumulation is likely to be sourced from windblown snow and, in particular, avalanching snow. It is estimated that the total accumulation needed to balance melting is potentially up to twice the amount accumulated from direct precipitation. The presence of these glaciers, the southernmost in Europe, at altitudes well below the regional snow line highlights the importance of local controls on glacier development. The geographers think at least eight glaciers were present in neighbouring mountains during the 19th century, correlating with the culmination of the Little Ice Age in the European Alps.

Flora 

The vegetation of the Accursed Mountains is among the richest on the Balkan Peninsula and one of the main central European regions for flora. To date, 1,611 wild plants have been described in the Albanian part alone.  50 flora species are endemic, sub-endemic and endangered plant species. The southern edge of mountains have a sub-Mediterranean character. Various evergreen bushes are found in the deepest valleys of the canyons and sunny slopes, and in the higher valleys deciduous Shibljak shrubs are common. In the mountains over 100 medicinal herbs are found, including species of the genus Primula, Satureja and Sideritis. Because of its altitude and its favored habitat, the range is one of the centers of arcto-alpine relict flora of the Balkan Peninsula. Out of 77 arcto-alpine species of former glacial flora on the Balkan Peninsula, a little over 50 species can be found in the Accursed Mountains.

The levels of vegetation in the Accursed Mountains meet the alpine level, from upland valleys through the montane mountain stage on forest-free alpine and subalpine mats and subnivale tundra caused by permafrost in vast heaps of rubble with raw soils. A real snow level is not widely spread, although in the high altitudes snow and fern fields can also keep during the summer on four very small glaciers at high altitudes, the highest one found in the shade of Jezerca.

Beech, fir and silicate spruce forests dominate the mountain areas. Rarely, however, the Northern Europe species are found, typically the Scots pine (Pinus sylvestris). The drought-resistant Mediterranean-sized black pine (Pinus nigra) is also common. Aspens (Populus tremula) grow in damp sites alongside mountain maple (Acer pseudoplatanus) and Norway spruce (Picea abies). The Accursed Mountains are one of the southernmost areas where spruce grow in Europe. The "combat zones" of the forest are formed with dense thickets of mountain pine (Pinus mugos). Conifers like the snakeskin pine (Pinus heldreichii) are on carbonate rocks and the Macedonian pine (Pinus peuce) of silicates are typical elements of the endemic Balkan flora.

A cushion-sedge and blue grass lawn of (Seslerion juncifoliae) grows in alpine areas and, on shallow limestone soils, Oxytropidion dinaricae, to which the alpine grass krumm grows as in the Alps. Other plants include Alpine aster Aster alpinus, edelweiss Leontopodium alpinum and white mountain avens Dryas octopetala. These plants are atypical alpine plants specially adapted to the short growing season, UV radiation, cold and thin soils.

The flora in the rocky areas of the Accursed Mountains are particularly noteworthy, because they are rare rich and endemic species, including the Tertiary relic Amphoricarpos neumayeri. Many species of flora are either endemic or are mainly found in the Accursed Mountains. A plantain plant Plantaginaceae is found in the central Accursed Mountains as a variant of the alpine Wulfenie, but 700 km away it does not grow. Petasites doerfleri is only found on the Jezerca peaks, and the Albanian lily Lilium albanicum and Viola ducagjinica are only found at the top of the Maja Radohimës slope. Also noteworthy is the Viola vilaensis Hayek. Viola chelmea belong to a violet species that occur on the Montenegrin-Albanian border area, especially at the lake Bukumirsko Jezero at 2,100 meters, and are only found on Asia Minor and the Balkans where they can grow due to woody, robust rhizome, cleistogamous flowers, and a lack of foothills. The Accursed Mountains are also the only European area where the Tertiary relic Forsythia europaea grow.

Fauna 

Large mammal species that have long been extinct in other regions are found here, such as the Eurasian brown bear, grey wolf, red fox, European wildcat, roe deer, fallow deer, red deer, wild boar and European otter. The highly endangered Balkan lynx, a subspecies of the Eurasian lynx, is mainly found in the Theth National Park where about roughly 20–50 individuals still roam, though poaching is still a large threat. Chamois are found throughout the high altitudes; about 720 chamois live between the borders of Kosovo and Montenegro. There is speculation that the mouflon roamed the Accursed Mountains until World War I, when it disappeared.

Bird species include the golden eagle, snake eagle, honey buzzard, peregrine falcon, capercaillie, rock partridge, scops owl, Eurasian eagle owl and the snow finch. So far 140 species of butterflies have been found, which makes the Accursed Mountains the richest area in Europe for butterflies. 

The rivers are home to a growing number of marble trout. Among the amphibians are the alpine salamander (southernmost habitat), fire salamander, yellow-bellied toad and fire-bellied toad . The rich herpetofauna include the fence lizard, green lizard, Greek tortoise and snakes such as the true vipers, including the venomous horned viper and adder. The Accursed Mountains have one endemic species of lizard, the Prokletije rock lizard or Dinarolacerta montenegrina, named after the range.

Early climbing 
British climbers Sleeman, Elmalie and Ellwood were the first to reach the summit of Maja Jezercë on 26 July 1929. Years later Austrian mountaineers also scaled the summit. Many explorers and scientists have visited the Accursed Mountains, collecting rocks and samples to display in museums. By early summer 1929 all the summits were measured by Italian geodetes.

National parks 

There are four national parks in the Accursed Mountains — one each in Montenegro and Kosovo, and two in Albania. The Theth National Park in Albania was designated in 1966 and covers an area of  along the Thethi River. The main attraction in the park is the Grunas Waterfall. The Valbona Valley National Park in Albania was also designated in 1996 and covers  including the Valbona Valley and the Valbona River. This park is also referred to as the Gem of Albania. Kosovo, Albania, and Montenegro are planning to create another tri-state park in the area, that will be called the Balkans Peace Park.

Illegal deforestation is a major problem. To some extent even the national parks are affected. In dry summers forest fires are common. All the large mammals including wolves, chamois, foxes, badgers and wild boar are hunted without regard to national park boundaries.

Settlement, economy and transport 

The Accursed Mountains are home to Albanians, Montenegrins, Serbs and Bosniaks, but they are only very sparsely populated. At the edges there are some settlements: the Albanian Koplik and the Montenegrin Tuzi in the west near the Skadar Lake; Plav and Gusinje in of the northern valley of the upper Lim river in Montenegro and Bajram Curri, the main town of the district Tropoja, in the eastern part of the mountain range. Even the somewhat more distant, larger cities of Shkodra, Podgorica, Gjakova and Peja create their sphere of influence and are frequently visited by inhabitants of the highlands for errands, administrative procedures and market sales.

In the mountains, villages only have up to a few hundred inhabitants. They are often scattered settlements without a clear core. Among the biggest are Tamara and Selca, both in the valley of the Cem and belonging to the community of the Kelmend. The community of eight villages – including Vermosh – comprises 6,600 inhabitants. Tamara is currently the only place in the central mountains with infrastructure such as a secondary school. Tamara and Vermosh share a maternity hospital. Until the collapse of communism there were such facilities, for example, in the Shala Valley. Many residents of the villages in the interior such as Boga, Theth or Valbona live there only in the summer months, as the villages are cut off for many weeks during winter.

In addition to the seasonal migration, the whole mountain area is suffering from a severe "brain drain", as its income from agriculture is low. Many leave to seek work and a little more comfort in the region of Shkodra and Koplik, Tirana or abroad. As the year-round population dwindles as the terrain becomes less accessible, there are few state or local government employees such as teachers. Local income comes from agriculture, semi-illegal forestry and tourism.

In a few places like Theth tourism has been revitalized by recreational hiking. With the help of GTZ, 40 private houses (also referred to as guest houses, or han in Albanian) have been transformed into tourist accommodations or B&Bs. In 2010 there were 130 beds available in total – 100 more than in 2007. Additionally, hiking trails have been marked and trails maps and travel guides published. In the period from 2006 to 2009, the number of tourists rose from 300 to around 7,500 per year. Unlike in the rest of Albania, the increase was due to foreign tourists. Lakes such as Plav and Hrid also receive many tourists during the summer months. In many villages there are small hydroelectric power plants that supply the village with electricity.

Many villages were already settled by the 15th century, and some valleys have been inhabited since the Stone Age. At the end of communism, however, several thousand people emigrated and depopulated the area.

Transport in Albania

SH20 road crosses the Accursed Mountains in the Kelmend region of northwestern Albania, stretching from the eastern shore of Lake Scutari at the Han i Hotit border crossing with Montenegro, to the first pass into the valley of Cem. It then leads to the source elevation of the Qafa e Predelecit after Vermosh, followed by another border crossing, ending at Gusinje.  the SH20 stretch between Hani Hotit and Tamare has been paved and upgraded to European standards.

From west to east, there is only the SH21 road recently paved from Koplik to Boga. The road from Qafa Thores leading to Theth has been recently paved with crash barriers and guard rails added, but is still steep, winding and narrow in places. From Theth, there is a bad track down to the Shala Valley Church and only a walking path along the river leads to Shkodra. SH22 road over the Qafa e Morinës at Bajram Curri after Gjakova has been reconstructed. In the past, the only route for crossing the border between Montenegro and Kosovo was via Rugova Canyon, which was very dangerous and steep. With the construction of the Peja–Rožaje highway the situation has greatly improved. In addition, SH42 road leading to Razem from SH21 has also been recently reconstructed.

Historically, a caravan route between Podgorica and Plav crossed the mountains along the Lim and Cem rivers.

Notes

References

Further reading 
Boenzi Federico, Giovanni Palmentola: "Glacial Features and Snow-Line Trend During the Last Glacial Age in the Southern Apennines (Italy) and on Albanian and Greek Mountains", in: Journal of Geomorphology, 41, 21–29, Berlin 1997.
Cook, Steve and Marash Rakaj. "Social Changes in the Albanian Alps During Communism". Middle States Geographer 28, 1995:84–90.
Jovan Cvijić : "Ice Age in Prokletije and Surrounding Mountains". The – Glass SKAN, XCI, Belgrade 1913th (Original: Cvijic, J. 1921: Ledeno doba u i Prokletijama okolnim planinama .- Glasnik Srpske Akad Kraljevske XCL, 1913, XCIII.)
Jovan Cvijić: Geomorphology I-II, Belgrade 1924/26.
Edith Durham : High Albania, London 1909
Helmut Eberhart, Karl Kaser (Editor): Albania – Tribal Life between Tradition and Modernity, Böhlau Verlag, Wien 1995, 
Rose Wilder Lane: Peaks of Shala, Harper & Brothers: New York, 1923.
Milovan Milivojevića, Ljubomir Menkovića and Jelena Calic: "Pleistocene Glacial Relief of the Central Part of Mt Prokletije". In: Quaternary International, v. 190, 1, 1 November 2008, 112–122
Franz Nopcsa : Geography and Geology of Northern Albania, Institutum Regni Hungariae Geologicum, Budapest 1929
Christian Zindel, Barbara House Amman: Hiking North Albania – Thethi and Kelmend, Huber Verlag, Munich 2008,

External links

Academic 

 Prokletije on BirdLife
 Peace parks of Prokletije
 Montenegrin Prokletije
 Prokletije at summitpost.org
 GTZ. Successful Cooperation – Sustainable Results: Examples from Europe, Caucasus and Central Asia, Berlin, 2010

News articles 

  (French)

 
Dinaric Mountains mixed forests
Mountain ranges of Albania
Mountain ranges of Europe
Mountain ranges of Kosovo
Mountains of Montenegro
National parks of Montenegro
Two-thousanders of Albania
Two-thousanders of Kosovo
Two-thousanders of Montenegro
Valbonë Valley National Park